The Winter Wake is the third studio album by Italian folk/power metal band Elvenking. It features the return of original vocalist, Damnagoras, and the departure of guitarist, Jarpen. The lyrical content of the album centers around fantasy, folklore, fairy tales, and feeling alone and being an outsider or an outcast as well as hints at the music industry with songs such as the Skyclad cover, "Penny Dreadful".

Track listing
All songs written by Aydan, except where noted.
 "Trows Kind" – 5:57
 "Swallowtail" (Damnagoras) – 4:26
 "The Winter Wake" [feat. Marcel Schirmer]– 4:19
 "The Wanderer" – 4:54
 "March of Fools" – 5:46
 "On the Morning Dew" – 3:30
 "Devil's Carriage" (Damnagoras) – 4:04
 "Rats Are Following" (Aydan, Damnagoras) – 4:37
 "Rouse Your Dream" – 4:48
 "Neverending Nights" (Damnagoras) – 7:01
 "Disillusion's Reel" (Damnagoras) – 2:19
Bonus Songs
 "Penny Dreadful" – 3:11 (Skyclad cover) (European Bonus)
 "Petalstorm" – 4:49 (Aydan, Damnagoras) (Japanese Bonus)

Personnel
 Damnagoras – vocals, additional lead guitars on "Neverending Nights"
 Aydan – guitars, backing vocals
 Gorlan – bass guitar
 Elyghen – violin, keyboards
 Zender – drums

Guest musicians
 Marcel Schirmer (Destruction) – vocals on "The Winter Wake"
 Nino Laurenne (Thunderstone) – 2nd solo on "Trows Kind"
 Jarpen (after leaving) – 2nd solo on "The Winter Wake"
 Pauline Tacey – soprano vocals on "March of Fools" and "Disillusion's Reel"
 Laura De Luca – vocals on "On the Morning Dew"
 Isabella "Whisperwind" Tuni – fairy voice on "Trows Kind"
 Umberto Corazza – flutes

Choirs
 Pauline Tacey, Laura De Luca, Giada Etro, Isabella Tuni, Claudio Coassin, Damnagoras, Aydan, Elyghen

String quartet
 Arranged by Elyghen
 Eleonora Steffan – violin
 Attilio Zardini – violin
 Elyghen – viola
 Marco Balbinot – cello

References

Elvenking (band) albums
2006 albums
AFM Records albums